I. C. Brătianu (Azaclău or Zaclău until 1907; I. C. Brătianu from 1907 to 1944; 23 August during the Communist era and until 1996) is a commune in Tulcea County, Northern Dobruja, Romania. It is composed of a single village, I. C. Brătianu. It was named after Ion C. Brătianu, Prime Minister of Romania.

References

Communes in Tulcea County
Localities in Northern Dobruja